Erica or ERICA may refer to:

 Erica (given name)
 Erica (plant), a flowering plant genus
 Erica (chatbot), a service of Bank of America
 Erica (video game), a 2019 FMV video game  
 Erica (spider), a jumping spider genus
 Erica, Emmen, a village in Drenthe, the Netherlands
 Erica, Victoria, a town in Australia
Erica railway station
 ERICA:
 Experiment on Rapidly Intensifying Cyclones over the Atlantic, a meteorological system
 Embryo Ranking Intelligent Classification Algorithm, an AI tool for embryologists
 HMS Erica (K50) (1940–1943), a British Royal Navy corvette
 SS Erica, an Italian steamship in service 1935-40
 Erica, a 1970s public television program starring Erica Wilson

See also 
Frederica (disambiguation)
Erika (disambiguation)